Aymo Maggi (30 July 1903 – 23 October 1961) was an Italian racing car driver from Brescia. He was the conte di Gradella based in Pandino outside Cremona.

Maggi started automobile racing in 1922 and had his first important victory in his hometown 1924 race between Gargnano-Tignale.  He won Circuito del Garda in 1925 and 1926, as well as the Rome Grand Prix in 1926. Maggi drove in a Bugatti Type 35 and Bugatti Type 36 
alongside Ettore Bugatti and Bartolomeo Costantini.

With Franco Mazzotti and two others, he was the organizer of the first Mille Miglia in 1927, as Brescia in 1921 had lost the role of hosting Italian Grand Prix to Milan and the Autodromo Nazionale Monza.  In his own race, he got 6th place driving an Isotta Fraschini 8A SS in 1927 with Bindo Maserati.

He survived his first heart attack in 1959, but died from his second in 1961.

References

Further reading

Italian racing drivers
Grand Prix drivers
Mille Miglia drivers
Sportspeople from Brescia
Counts of Italy
1903 births
1961 deaths